Starship & Haiku is a novel by Somtow Sucharitkul published in 1981.

Plot summary
Starship & Haiku is a novel in which the people of Japan seek to die honorably after the world is ravaged by biological and nuclear war.

Reception
Greg Costikyan reviewed Starship and Haiku in Ares Magazine #12 and commented that "A rather depressing book enlightened by good writing, it is more serious in tone and intent than Sucharitkul's short stories. Worth reading mostly because Sucharitkul is likely to become a more interesting writer as time goes on."

The novel won the Locus Award for Best First Novel in 1982.

Reviews
Review by Jeff Frane (1981) in Locus, #248 September 1981 
Review by Robert A. Collins (1981) in Fantasy Newsletter, #42 November 1981 
Review by Baird Searles (1981) in Isaac Asimov's Science Fiction Magazine, November 23, 1981 
Review by Theodore Sturgeon (1982) in Rod Serling's The Twilight Zone Magazine, January 1982 
Review by Tom Easton (1982) in Analog Science Fiction/Science Fact, May 1982

References

1981 novels
Fiction by S. P. Somtow